The Liberal Swedish Party  (In Swedish: Svenska frisinnade partiet, RVP, In Finnish Ruotsalainen vapaamielinen puolue) was a political party in Finland, working amongst the Swedish-speaking minority. The party founded in 1919 under the name of Swedish Left (In Swedish: Svensk Vänster, SV and in Finnish Ruotsalainen vasemmisto, RV)  until the 1947. Ideologically the party preferred a republican state rather than a monarchy, which differentiated them from the majority of the Swedish People's Party, which tended to hold more conservative views. The party was represented in the Parliament of Finland by Georg Schauman, Georg von Wendt and Max Sergelius. The party was dissolved in 1951.

In the 1945 parliamentary election the party got 8 192 votes (0.48%) and one seat.

Defunct political parties in Finland
Defunct liberal political parties
Radical parties
Republican parties
Political parties established in 1919
Political parties disestablished in 1951
1919 establishments in Finland
1951 disestablishments in Finland
Liberal parties in Finland